Hydrocynus goliath, also known as the goliath tigerfish, giant tigerfish, or mbenga, is a very large African predatory freshwater fish of the family Alestidae.

Distribution
Hydrocynus goliath is found in the Congo River Basin (including Lualaba River and Lake Upemba), and Lake Tanganyika. A study published in 2011 revealed several mtDNA clades in this region, suggesting a higher tigerfish species richness than traditionally recognized. If confirmed, this would restrict H. goliath to the Congo River Basin. Four additional species (H. vittatus and three unknown species) appear to be present in this Basin, while two (H. vittatus and an unknown species) appear to be present in Lake Tanganyika.

Description

Its teeth fit into distinct grooves along its jaws.

Diet
Hydrocynus goliath is a piscivore, feeding on any fish it can overpower, including smaller members of the same species.

When hunting, this fish uses the calmer eddies of the rapids to ambush its prey, using its keen sight to detect prey. When a target is noticed, the fish accelerates to chase it down. The Nile crocodile is the only known predator of mature goliath tigerfish.

Interaction with humans
A number of incidents have been reported in the Congo of this fish attacking humans. This reputation, combined with its strength, has earned it an almost mythical status among anglers, and it has been called the "greatest freshwater gamefish in the world".

References

External links
 Goliath Tigerfish | The Proceedings of the Ever so Strange
 https://web.archive.org/web/20101206040928/http://channel.nationalgeographic.com/series/explorer/3826/Overview
 
 "Mystical goliath tiger fish caught on camera ". 21 October 2010.

Alestidae
Freshwater fish of Central Africa
Congo drainage basin
Taxa named by George Albert Boulenger
Fish described in 1898
Sport fish